The 1985 Grand Prix de Tennis de Toulouse was a men's tennis tournament played on indoor carpet courts in Toulouse, France that was part of the Regular Series of the 1985 Grand Prix tennis circuit. It was the fourth edition of the tournament and was held from 7 October until 13 October 1985. First-seeded Yannick Noah won the singles title.

Finals

Singles

 Yannick Noah defeated  Tomáš Šmíd, 6–4, 6–4
 It was Noah's 3rd singles title of the year and the 17th of his career.

Doubles

 Ricardo Acuña /  Jakob Hlasek defeated  Pavel Složil /  Tomáš Šmíd, 3–6, 6–2, 9–7

References

External links
 ITF tournament edition details

Grand Prix de Tennis de Toulouse
Grand Prix de Tennis de Toulouse
Grand Prix de Tennis de Toulouse
Grand Prix de Tennis de Toulouse